Census Division No. 5 is a Statistics Canada statistical division composed of the areas of the province of Newfoundland and Labrador called Humber Valley, Bay of Islands, and White Bay. It covers a land area of 10,365.63 km² (4,002.19 sq mi), and had a population of 42,014 according to the 2016 census.

Cities
Corner Brook

Towns
Cormack
Cox's Cove
Deer Lake
Gillams
Hampden
Howley
Hughes Brook
Humber Arm South
Irishtown-Summerside
Jackson's Arm
Lark Harbour
Massey Drive
McIvers
Meadows
Mount Moriah
Pasadena
Reidville
Steady Brook
York Harbour

Unorganized subdivisions
Subdivision A (Includes: St. Jude's, and Hinds Lake)
Subdivision C (Includes: Spruce Brook, George's Lake, Pinchgut Lake)
Subdivision D (Includes: North Arm, Middle Arm, Goose Arm, Serpentine Lake)
Subdivision E (Includes: Galeville, The Beaches)
Subdivision F (Includes: Pynn's Brook, Little Rapids, Humber Valley Resort)
Subdivision G (Includes: Pollards Point, Sops Arm)

Demographics

References

Sources

005